is a station on the Tokyo Sakura Tram. This is the terminus of the line. It is close to Minowa Station on the Tokyo Metro Hibiya Line.

Lines
Tokyo Sakura Tram

Surrounding area
 Minowa Station ( Tokyo Metro Hibiya Line) (approximately 5 minutes walk)

Railway stations in Tokyo
Railway stations in Japan opened in 1913
Arakawa, Tokyo